Liimatainen is a Finnish surname. Notable people with the surname include:

Heikki L, real name Heikki Liimatainen, Finnish house music producer, DJ and remixer
Heikki Liimatainen (athlete) (1894–1980), Finnish athlete and Olympian in Cross Country
Jani Liimatainen (born 1980), guitar player and a founding members of the power metal band Sonata Arctica
Jorma Liimatainen (born 1947), Finnish wrestler
Petri Liimatainen (born 1969), Swedish ice hockey player
Jonne Aaron Liimatainen (born 1983), Finnish singer, songwriter, musician and producer.

Finnish-language surnames